Felixstowe Pier is a pleasure pier in the Edwardian seaside town of Felixstowe, Suffolk, England. Steamer services operated from the pier to various destinations.

During the war, the pier was sectioned to reduce the risk of enemy invasion, which it never fully recovered from, resulting in the pierhead being demolished after the war, having been left to deteriorate.

In 2017, a new shore-end structure was opened to the public at a cost of £3m, offering family entertainments as part of a wider regeneration scheme for the local area.

History
The pier was constructed using timber, rather than iron, which was unusual for this period, though foreign timbers such as Jarrah and Greenheart had been increasing in popularity due to their resistance against worms and being more cost effective. A 3ft 6in gauge electric tram service operated to and from the pier head. Paddle steamer boat services took visitors to and from other resorts for 1 penny, including London Bridge and Great Yarmouth at a time when steamers faced competition from railway services.

The Coast Development Corporation succeeded the Coast Development Company in 1905, but subsequently went into liquidation 10 years later in 1915 and were acquired by East Coast Piers Limited, who continued operation of the tram system during the summer season.

The pier was sectioned during the war by the Royal Engineers for defence purposes to prevent enemy invasion, which included the indefinite suspension of the tram system which never resumed after the war. Its seaward end was neglected during the war and was ultimately demolished once the war was over, with further reductions in its length occurring during the 1950s.

Renovation plans

Various repair and renovation plans were proposed over the years, including in 1996 for a repair project that was estimated to cost around £2.5m. Separately in 1999, a charity trust was established to aid refurbishment, aiming to raise £15m but no progress was made due to lack of listed status and the project was abandoned in 2002. The owners submitted a demolition request in 2004.

Modern pier
A project to rebuild the pier's main building was approved by councillors in 2012, with anticipation that work in demolishing the old pier building could occur several months later. The rebuild was delayed primarily due to costs in achieving good value for money, as well as negotiations regarding additional land required for the new structure that wasn't owned by the pier owners. The council received nine letters of objection to the project, including complaints that the new structure's size may obscure the view of the sea; in contrast, seven letters were received in support, including people saying it would be a boost to tourism and help wider regeneration of the local area.

In August 2017, a new £3 million pier and building opened to visitors with the official opening in October 2017, as part of a wider regeneration scheme for the area. The new structure includes a bowling alley, arcade machines and wraparound boardwork. The pier decking extending over the sea remained; however due to safety concerns, visitors are not able to walk the entire length which has been inaccessible since around 1999 due to corrosion and rotten timber beams supporting the pier deck. The original plan involved demolishing this section of pier until an alternate proposal to retain it was put forward.

References
Citations

Sources

External links

 Felixstowe Pier TripAdvisor

Felixstowe
Piers in Suffolk